Women Who Flirt is a 2014 Chinese-Hong Kong romantic comedy film directed by Pang Ho-cheung and starring Zhou Xun, Huang Xiaoming, Xie Yilin and Sonia Sui. The film was released on November 28, 2014.

Cast
 Zhou Xun
 Huang Xiaoming 
 Evonne Hsieh
 Sonia Sui

Reception
By December 20, 2014, the film had earned ¥223.54 million at the box office.

On Film Business Asia, Derek Elley gave the film a 6 out of 10, calling it a "loosely written rom-com [that] relies almost entirely on actress Zhou Xun's screen persona."

Anite Gates for the New York Times said, "The film is exaggerated, ludicrous and simplistic. It shows a towering disdain for both men and women. But Angie and Marco have a certain good-natured charm, and there are some nice shots of Shanghai."

References

External links
 

2014 films
Chinese romantic comedy films
Hong Kong romantic comedy films
2010s Mandarin-language films
Films set in Shanghai
Films shot in Shanghai
2014 romantic comedy films
Films directed by Pang Ho-cheung
2010s Hong Kong films